The Last Day is a 2004 French romantic drama film written and directed by Rodolphe Marconi, starring Nicole Garcia and Gaspard Ulliel.

Plot
At Christmas, 18-year-old Simon arrives at his parents' home with a young woman he has just met on the night train. During the stay, a phone call comes to stir this family that has been keeping a secret for twenty years. At the same time, Simon is dealing with his unrequited love for another man.

Cast
 Gaspard Ulliel as Simon
 Nicole Garcia as Marie
 Mélanie Laurent as Louise
 Bruno Todeschini as Marc
 Alysson Paradis as Alice
 Christophe Malavoy as Jean-Louis
 Thibault Vinçon as Mathieu

Release
The film was released in France by Gémini Films on 3 November 2004. Strand Releasing acquired the U.S. rights to the film and released it on DVD on 13 December 2005.

Reception
French cinema website AlloCiné gave the film an average rating of 3.3/5, based on a survey of 15 French reviews.

References

External links
 
 
 

2004 films
2004 LGBT-related films
2004 romantic drama films
2000s French films
2000s French-language films
Films shot in Paris
French romantic drama films
Gay-related films
LGBT-related romantic drama films